Limnellia quadrata is a species of fly in the family Ephydridae. It is found in the  Palearctic .
It is 2 or 3 mm long and has distinctively patterned wings. It is found in meadows.

References

External links
Images representing Limnellia quadrata at BOLD
Ecology of Commanster

Ephydridae
Insects described in 1813
Diptera of Europe
Taxa named by Carl Fredrik Fallén